Frederick Fryer may refer to:
 Frederick Fryer (British Army officer)
 Frederick Fryer (cricketer)
 Sir Frederick William Richards Fryer, lieutenant governor of Burma